Ivo Pacheco, professionally known as IVVVO, is a Portuguese musician, artist and curator, currently the creative director of hymodernity.com.

His practice is primarily occupied with concepts of millennial anxiety, social angst, vulnerability, and the global crisis's agony, analysing its constituents’ parts for reuse in a different context. 
He shifts the condition of constant deconstruction and reconfiguration and the idea of a non-hierarchical, boundaryless universe, maintaining a taste for intensity and emotions as a tool for immersive engagement in addressing the repressed underpinnings of contemporary culture.

Terrain Ahead
Founded by the hands of Ivo Pacheco (IVVVO), Luis Dourado (Purple) and Tiago Carneiro (Solution) in late 2010, Terrain Ahead was the cradle of a new generation of electronic musicians that emerged in Oporto. With a distinct logo and an unusual sonority that began to make an impression on the nights of their hometown, Terrain Ahead slowly earned its place as one of the avant garde labels to keep an eye on. This was the environment in which IVVVO grew as an artist, giving him the tools to explore the sounds of electronic music in all its diversity and in an assertive way.

Albums
Occult (moun10, 2012)
All Shades Of White (Opal Tapes, 2012)
 Prince of Grunge (Nyx Unchained, 2017)
 doG (Halcyon Veil, 2019)
 Bleached Butterfly (AD 93, 2022)

EPs and singles
Here EP (Terrain Ahead, 2011)
I Just Love You EP (Terrain Ahead, 2011)
Future EP (Public Information, 2013)
Light Moving EP (Fourth Wave, 2013)
Theories of Anxiety EP (Danse Noire, 2014)
Mark Leckey Made Me Hardcore EP (Crème Organization, 2015)
Good, Bad, Baby, Horny EP (Halcyon Veil, 2017)

Other albums
Dead Cities Vol.1 (One Eyed Jacks, 2012)

References

External links
IVVVO's Discography at Discogs.com

1989 births
Living people
Portuguese musicians
Portuguese male musicians
Experimental musicians
Industrial musicians